Guerra de Titanes (2005) ("War of the Titans") was the ninth Guerra de Titanes professional wrestling show promoted by AAA. The show took place on December 10, 2005 in Guadalajara, Jalisco, Mexico. The Main event featured Eight-man "Atómics" tag team match between the teams of La Secta Cibernetica (Cibernético, Dark Cuervo and Dark Escoria) and Abismo Negro, Latin Lover and La Parka.

Production

Background
Starting in 1997 the Mexican professional wrestling, company AAA has held a major wrestling show late in the year, either November or December, called Guerra de Titanes ("War of the Titans"). The show often features championship matches or Lucha de Apuestas or bet matches where the competitors risked their wrestling mask or hair on the outcome of the match. In Lucha Libre the Lucha de Apuetas match is considered more prestigious than a championship match and a lot of the major shows feature one or more Apuesta matches. The Guerra de Titanes show is hosted by a new location each year, emanating from cities such as Madero, Chihuahua, Chihuahua, Mexico City, Guadalajara, Jalisco and more. The 2005 Guerra de Titanes show was the ninth show in the series.

Storylines
The Guerra de Titanes show featured nine professional wrestling matches with different wrestlers involved in pre-existing, scripted feuds, plots, and storylines. Wrestlers were portrayed as either heels (referred to as rudos in Mexico, those that portray the "bad guys") or faces (técnicos in Mexico, the "good guy" characters) as they followed a series of tension-building events, which culminated in a wrestling match or series of matches.

Results

References

2005 in professional wrestling
Guerra de Titanes
2005 in Mexico
December 2005 events in Mexico